Giuseppe Volpecina (born 1 May 1961 in Caserta) is an Italian professional footballer who played as a defender.

Honours
Napoli
 Serie A: 1986–87
 Coppa Italia: 1986–87

References

1961 births
Living people
People from Caserta
Italian footballers
Association football defenders
Serie A players
Serie B players
S.S.C. Napoli players
Palermo F.C. players
Pisa S.C. players
Hellas Verona F.C. players
ACF Fiorentina players
Casertana F.C. players
Footballers from Campania
Sportspeople from the Province of Caserta